Chen Xiao (born 5 July 1987) is a Chinese actor and model. He is best known for his roles in Swordsman (2013), Legend of Lu Zhen (2013), The Romance of the Condor Heroes (2014), Who Sleeps My Bro (2015), Nothing Gold Can Stay (2017) and Love Journey (2018).

Chen ranked 93rd on Forbes China Celebrity 100 list in 2014, and 74th in 2015.

Early life and education
Chen Xiao was born in Hefei, Anhui. At the age of 10, he was cast in his first television series Our Class Song (1997). Chen graduated from the Central Academy of Drama in 2009.

Career

2009–2012: Beginnings 
In 2009, Chen signed with his first agency Huayi Brothers. He then featured in the film Detective Dee and the Mystery of the Phantom Flame, directed by Tsui Hark. The same year, he appeared in the television series Spell of the Fragrance produced by Yu Zheng. Chen continued to appear in several television series under Yu Zheng, but only official signed a contract with him after starring in Beauties of the Emperor. Chen started to gain attention as an actor in the 2012 hit palace drama Palace II where his portrayal of the 19th prince attracted positive audience reviews.

2013–2016: Rising popularity
Chen rose to fame with his role of Lin Pingzhi in the 2013 wuxia television series Swordsman, which was adapted from Louis Cha's novel The Smiling, Proud Wanderer. He then played his first leading role in historical drama Legend of Lu Zhen, where he took on the role of a wise and devoted Emperor. The series was both a domestic and overseas hit, and led to increased recognition for Chen. 

In 2014, he starred in wuxia romance drama The Romance of the Condor Heroes, playing Yang Guo. Chen's portrayal of the character earned praised by fans of the original novel by Louis Cha, which further raised his popularity. He also featured in wuxia film The Taking of Tiger Mountain directed by Tsui Hark; playing a young and hot-blooded policeman. He was nominated at the Hundred Flowers Award for Best Supporting Actor.

In 2015, Chen co-starred in historical romance drama Love Yunge from the Desert, adapted from the novel Song in the Clouds by Tong Hua. Despite the mixed reviews and criticism for the series, Chen received acclaim for his performance as a clumsy assassin.

In 2016, Chen starred in the coming-of-age web series Who Sleeps My Bro, which gained a large following online and became a cult classic. The same year, he starred in wuxia drama The Three Heroes and Five Gallants, based on the novel of the same name by Shi Yukun; playing Bai Yutang. Chen was nominated for the Best Actor award in the ancient drama category at the Huading Awards.

2017–present: Acclaim
In 2017, he starred alongside Sun Li in the historical drama Nothing Gold Can Stay, which earned high ratings of 3%. Chen received acclaim for his acting performance and character interpretation, and experienced a resurgence of popularity. 

In 2019, Chen starred alongside Joe Chen in the historical television series Queen Dugu, playing the role of the Emperor Wen of Sui. 
The same year, he starred in road-trip suspense drama Love Journey directed and written by Mao Weining. Chen played an undercover cop who appears frivolous but is serious and passionate about his job, and received positive reviews for his performance. He then played a violinist in the romance suspense film  Lost in Love directed by Huo Jianqi, as well as military drama The King of Land Battle.

Chen is set to star in the political television series The People's Property, the sequel to the highly successful drama In the Name of People.

Personal life
Chen Xiao married his The Romance of the Condor Heroes co-star Michelle Chen in 2016. Michelle gave birth to their first son in the same year.

Filmography

Film

Television series

Short film

Music video

Theater

Discography

Bibliography

Awards and nominations

References

21st-century Chinese male actors
Male actors from Anhui
Chinese male film actors
Chinese male television actors
People from Hefei
Central Academy of Drama alumni
1987 births
Living people